Blow Me Down Provincial Park is a smaller Provincial Park on the west coast of the island of Newfoundland.  The park is located on Route 450, about 60 km (37 mi) west of Corner Brook and the Trans-Canada Highway, on a small peninsula between Lark Harbour and York Harbour at the mouth of the Bay of Islands.

See also
List of Newfoundland and Labrador parks
List of Canadian provincial parks
List of National Parks of Canada

References

Provincial parks of Newfoundland and Labrador